The Democratic Nationalist Party was a conservative political party in Malta.

History
The party was established in 1883 as the Anti-Reform Party (Partito Anti-Reformista) by Fortunato Mizzi. It won seven of the eight seats in the Government Council in the elections that year.

In 1903 it was renamed the National Party (Partito Nazionale), and in 1921 it was succeeded by the Democratic Nationalist Party, set up by Enrico Mizzi (son of Fortunato) to absorb the old party. It won only four of the 32 seats in the 1921 elections, and five in the 1924 elections.

Due to its lack of success, the party merged with the Maltese Political Union in 1926 to form the Nationalist Party.

Ideology
As the Anti-Reform Party, the party sought to preserve Italian as the language of education, government and law, and was in favour of the church retaining its power. It was largely supported by wealthy urban professionals. When it became the National Party in 1903, the party operated a policy of non-cooperation with the British authorities.

The Democratic Nationalist Party aimed to widen its supporter base by promoting social welfare, but retained its commitment to making the Italian language an official language alongside English.

Election results

References

Defunct political parties in Malta
Political parties established in 1883
Political parties disestablished in 1926
Maltese nationalism
1883 establishments in Malta
1926 disestablishments in Malta
Conservative parties in Malta
Catholic political parties